The Harvard Avenue Historic District is a historic district roughly bounded by Linden Street, Commonwealth Avenue, Harvard Avenue, and Park Vale Avenue in the Allston neighborhood of Boston, Massachusetts.  Its spine is Harvard Avenue, a major north–south thoroughfare connecting Allston to points north (generally via Cambridge Street toward Cambridge), and south toward Brookline.  The area underwent a population explosion in the early 20th century, and Harvard Avenue was developed roughly between 1905 and 1925 as a commercial and residential spine.  Notable buildings in the district include the Allston Station building, designed by Shepley, Rutan and Coolidge, and the Harvard Avenue Fire Station.

The district was listed on the National Register of Historic Places in 2000.

See also
National Register of Historic Places listings in southern Boston, Massachusetts

References

Historic districts in Suffolk County, Massachusetts
National Register of Historic Places in Boston
Historic districts on the National Register of Historic Places in Massachusetts